Cellar may refer to:
Basement
Root cellar
Semi-basement
Storm cellar
Wine cellar

See also
Sellers (disambiguation)